Eline is a given name. Notable people with the name include:

Eline Berings (born 1986), Belgian athlete who competes in the 100 m hurdles
Eline Eriksen (1881–1963), wife of Edvard Eriksen, model for the Little Mermaid statue in Copenhagen, Denmark
Eline Flipse (born 1954), film director of documentaries
Eline Heger, née Schmidt (1774–1842), Danish stage actress and ballet dancer
Eline Jurg (born 1973), Dutch bobsledder
Eline Nygaard Riisnæs (1913–2011), Norwegian pianist
Marie Eline (1902–1981), American silent film child actress and sister of Grace Eline

See also
Cyclone Leon–Eline, long-lived Indian Ocean tropical cyclone
Eline Vere (film), 1991 Dutch film directed by Harry Kümel, based on the 1889 novel by Louis Couperus